The 1970-71 French Rugby Union Championship was contested by 64 teams divided in 8 pools. The first four of each pool, were qualified for the "last 32".

'Béziers won The French Rugby Union Championship beating Toulon in the final.

For Béziers, was the first of ten title in two decades, while Touloun had to wait until 1987.

Qualification round 
In bold the clubs qualified for the next round. The teams are listed according to the final ranking

"Last 32" 
In bold the clubs qualified for the next round

"Last 16" 
In bold the clubs qualified for the next round

Quarter of finals 
In bold the clubs qualified for the next round

Semifinals

Final

External links
 Compte rendu finale de 1971 lnr.fr

1971
1970–71 rugby union tournaments for clubs
Championship